The Anglican Church of St Leonard in Otterford, Somerset, England was built in the 14th century. It is a Grade II* listed building.

History

The church was built in the 14th century on the site of an earlier church. In 1158 Henry of Blois, the Bishop of Winchester, granted the Chapel of Otriforde to the Taunton Priory.

The church underwent Victorian restoration in 1860.

The parish is part of the Blackdown benefice within the Diocese of Bath and Wells.

Architecture

The limestone building has hamstone dressings. It has a three-bay nave and north aisle along with a chancel and vestry. The chancel barrel vault roof was built in the 16th century. Over the porch is a sundial.

See also  
 List of ecclesiastical parishes in the Diocese of Bath and Wells

References

Grade II* listed buildings in Taunton Deane
Grade II* listed churches in Somerset